José Pérez Francés (27 December 1936 – 30 September 2021) was a Spanish professional road racing cyclist. He finished four times on the podium of Vuelta a España and won three stages, although he never won the overall classification. He also finished third in 1963 Tour de France, after Jacques Anquetil and Federico Bahamontes, and won a stage in 1965.

Major Results 

1955
 1st Stage 4a Volta a la Comunitat Valenciana
1957 
 7th Overall Vuelta a Andalucía
1960
 2nd Overall Volta a Catalunya
1st Stages 3a (TTT) & 8
1961
 1st Gran Premio Navarra
 2nd Circuito Montañés
 3rd Overall Vuelta a España
1st Stage 8
 5th Overall Volta a Catalunya
 7th Overall Tour de France
 7th Overall Madrid–Barcelona
1st Stage 6a 
 8th Overall Volta a la Comunitat Valenciana
1962
 2nd Overall Vuelta a España
 2nd Road race, National Road Championships
 2nd Circuito de Getxo
 6th Overall Giro d'Italia
 8th Overall Volta a Catalunya
1st Stage 7 (ITT)
1963
 1st  Road race, National Road Championships
 1st  Overall Setmana Catalana de Ciclisme
 1st Gran Premio Navarra
 1st Stage 8 Vuelta a España
 1st Stage 8 Volta a la Comunitat Valenciana
 2nd Overall Critérium du Dauphiné Libéré
1st Stage 3 
 3rd Overall Tour de France
 4th Trofeo Masferrer
 6th Subida a Arrate
1964
 1st  Overall Setmana Catalana de Ciclisme
1st Stage 1 
 1st GP Villafranca de Ordizia
 Volta a Catalunya
1st Stages 1b & 6 
 Volta a la Comunitat Valenciana
 1st Stages 3 & 7
 3rd Overall Vuelta a España
1st  Points classification
 3rd Gran Premio Navarra
 3rd Klasika Primavera
 5th Gran Premio Fedrácion Catalana de Ciclismo 
 9th Barcelona-Andorra
 10th Overall Critérium du Dauphiné Libéré
 10th Trofeo Masferrer
1965
 1st  Overall Volta a la Comunitat Valenciana
1st Stages 1 & 7
 1st Gran Premio de Primavera
 5th Overall Setmana Catalana de Ciclisme
1st Stage 4 
 6th Overall Tour de France
1st Stage 11
 6th Trofeo Masferrer
1966
 1st Stage 1 Vuelta a Andalucía
 1st Stage 3 Vuelta a La Rioja
 3rd Klasika Primavera
 9th Overall Volta a Catalunya
1967
 1st  Overall Volta a la Comunitat Valenciana
1st Stages 2, 3 & 5a
 1st Barcelona-Andorra
 2nd Trofeo Masferrer
 3rd Overall Setmana Catalana de Ciclisme
1st Stage 4 
 5th Overall Giro d'Italia
 6th Overall Volta a Catalunya
 10th Overall Vuelta a España
1968
 Volta a la Comunitat Valenciana
1st Stages 2 & 4 
 2nd Overall Vuelta a España
1st Stage 12
 3rd GP Pascuas
 7th Overall Tour de Suisse
 8th Overall Euskal Bizikleta

References

External links 

 Palmarès by velo-club.net 
 Palmarès by memoire-du-cyclisme.net 

Spanish male cyclists
1936 births
2021 deaths
Spanish Tour de France stage winners
Spanish Vuelta a España stage winners
Sportspeople from Santander, Spain
Cyclists from Cantabria